Johannes Adamietz (born 24 May 1998) is a German professional racing cyclist, who currently rides for UCI ProTeam .

Major results
2015
 1st  National Junior Hill Climb Championships
2016
 1st  National Junior Hill Climb Championships
2017
 1st  National Under-23 Hill Climb Championships
2019
 2nd Road race, National Under-23 Road Championships
 6th Overall Tour du Jura
2022
 1st  National Hill Climb Championships
 2nd Sauerländer Bergpreis
 3rd Rad am Ring
 7th Overall Sibiu Cycling Tour

References

External links
 

1998 births
Living people
German male cyclists
Sportspeople from Ulm
21st-century German people